The 57th Dan Kolov & Nikola Petrov Tournament,  was a sport wrestling event held in  Ruse, Bulgaria between 28 February-3 March 2019. It was held as the fourth of the ranking series of United World Wrestling.

This international tournament includes competition in both men's and women's freestyle wrestling and men's Greco-Roman wrestling. This tournament is held in honor of Dan Kolov who was the first European freestyle wrestling champion from Bulgaria and  European and World Champion Nikola Petroff.

Medal table

Team ranking

Medal overview

Men's freestyle

Greco-Roman

Women's freestyle

Participating nations

540 competitors from 46 nations participated.
 (13)
 (6)
 (4)
 (1)
 (4)
 (13)
 (2)
 (41)
 (4)
 (31)
 (2)
 (18)
 (1)
 (5)
 (2)
 (4)
 (10)
 (10)
 (5)
 (12)
 (4)
 (1)
 (11)
 (12)
 (29)
 (22)
 (17)
 (1)
 (4)
 (12)
 (3)
 (3)
 (3)
 (5)
 (20)
 (16)
 (31)
 (3)
 (1)
 (1)
 (6)
 (24)
 (40)
 (29)
 (33)
 (17)

Ranking Series
Ranking Series Calendar 2019:
 1st Ranking Series: 24–28 January, Russia, Krasnoyarsk ⇒ Golden Grand Prix Ivan Yarygin 2019 (FS, WW)
 2nd Ranking Series: 9–10 February, Croatia, Zagreb ⇒ 2019 Grand Prix Zagreb Open (GR)
 3rd Ranking Series: 23–24 February, Hungary, Győr ⇒ Hungarian Grand Prix - Polyák Imre Memorial (GR)  
 4th Ranking Series: 28 February-3 March, Bulgaria, Ruse ⇒ 2019 Dan Kolov & Nikola Petrov Tournament (FS, WW, GR) 
 5th Ranking Series: 23–25 May, Italy, Sassari ⇒ Matteo Pellicone Ranking Series 2019 (FS, WW, GR)
 6th Ranking Series: 11–14 July, Turkey, Istanbul ⇒ 2019 Yasar Dogu Tournament (FS, WW)
 7th Ranking Series: 28 February-3 March, Belarus, Minsk ⇒ 2019 Oleg Karavaev Tournament (GR)

References 

2019 in European sport
2019 in sport wrestling
February 2019 sports events in Europe
2019 in Bulgarian sport